Cecilia Francis (born 17 September 1996) is a Nigerian sprinter who specializes in the 100 metres, 200 metres and 4 x 100 metres relay. Cecilia claimed gold alongside Blessing Okagbare, Lawretta Ozoh and Ngozi Onwumere in the 4 x 100 metres relay at the 2015 All-Africa Games in Brazzaville, Congo. She also represented Nigeria at the 2015 World Championships in Athletics in Beijing, China.

Doping case
Francis tested positive for the anabolic steroid metenolone at the 2013 African Youth Athletics Championships, as a 16-year old. She was given a one-year ban from sports after she cooperated with the authorities in an investigation. Athletics Federation of Nigeria banned her coach Abass Rauf for life, and Lee Evans got a four-year ban.

References

External links
 
 Cecilia Francis profile at All Athletics

1996 births
Living people
Athletes (track and field) at the 2015 African Games
Doping cases in athletics
Nigerian female sprinters
Nigerian sportspeople in doping cases
People from Lagos State
World Athletics Championships athletes for Nigeria
African Games gold medalists for Nigeria
African Games medalists in athletics (track and field)
20th-century Nigerian women
21st-century Nigerian women